Mbazwana is a town in Umhlabuyalingana Local Municipality and is part of Umkhanyakude District Municipality in the KwaZulu-Natal province of South Africa.

Settlement and plantation some 50 km east of Ubombo. Presumably takes its name from the tributary of the Mseleni. The name, of Zulu origin, is said to mean ‘small axe’, after a person called Mbazwana.

References

Populated places in the Umhlabuyalingana Local Municipality